Di Naye Kapelye is a Hungarian klezmer music group. The band formed in Budapest in 1993, and perform frequently throughout Europe. Their lyrics are primarily in Yiddish and Hungarian.

Members
Bob Cohen (violin, mandolin, koboz, cumbus, flutes, Carpathian drum, vocals)
Yankl Falk (clarinet, vocals)
Ferenc Pribojszki (cimbalom, Carpathian drum, flutes)
Antal Fekete (kontra)
Gyula Kozma (bass, koboz, violin).

Discography
1997 - Di Naye Kapelye (Oriente) 
2001 - A Mazeldiker Yid (Oriente)
2008 - Traktorist (Oriente)

External links
The Di Naye Kapelye official site 
Dumneazu - Bob Cohen's blog

Di Naye Kapelye
Di Naye Kapelye